Andrew Mitchell Uniacke (1808 – 1895) was a lawyer, banker and politician in Nova Scotia. He represented Halifax township in the Nova Scotia House of Assembly from 1843 to 1847.

He was born in Halifax, the son of Richard John Uniacke and Eliza Newton. He was educated at King's College and went on to study law. In 1834, he married Elizabeth Fraser. He was president of the Bank of Nova Scotia from 1872 to 1874. He died in Dover, England.

References 
 

1808 births
1895 deaths
Scotiabank presidents
Nova Scotia pre-Confederation MLAs